Tähtvere is a neighbourhood of Tartu, Estonia.

Gallery

See also
Estonian University of Life Sciences
Tartu Song Festival Grounds
A. Le Coq

References

Tartu